The 2015 Wrocław Open was a professional tennis tournament played on hard courts. It was the first edition of the tournament which was part of the 2015 ATP Challenger Tour. It took place in Wrocław, Poland between 16 and 22 February 2015.

Singles main-draw entrants

Seeds

 1 Rankings are as of February 9, 2015.

Other entrants
The following players received wildcards into the singles main draw:
  Michał Dembek
  Hubert Hurkacz
  Andriej Kapaś
  Kamil Majchrzak

The following players received entry from the qualifying draw:
  Mirza Bašić
  Laslo Djere
  Frederik Nielsen
  Maximilian Marterer

The following players received entry into the main draw as a lucky loser:
  Martin Fischer

Champions

Singles

 Farrukh Dustov def.  Mirza Bašić, 6–3, 6–4

Doubles

 Philipp Petzschner /  Tim Pütz def.  Frank Dancevic /  Andriej Kapaś, 7–6(7–4), 6–3

External links
 Official Website

Wroclaw Open
Wrocław Open
Wroc